The 1987 Open Clarins was a women's tennis tournament played on outdoor clay courts in Paris, France, and was part of the Category 1 tier of the 1987 WTA Tour. It was the inaugural edition of the tournament and was held from 28 September until 4 October 1987. Unseeded Sabrina Goleš won the singles title and earned $10,000 first-prize money.

Finals

Singles
 Sabrina Goleš defeated  Sandra Wasserman 7–5, 6–1
 It was Goleš' only singles title of her career.

Doubles
 Isabelle Demongeot /  Nathalie Tauziat defeated  Sandra Cecchini /  Sabrina Goleš 1–6, 6–3, 6–3

References

External links
 ITF tournament edition details
 Tournament draws

1987 Virginia Slims World Championship Series
1987
1987 in Paris
1987 in French tennis